David McGillivray (born September 30, 1949 in Sarnia, Ontario) was a Canadian figure skater who competed in men's singles. He competed at the 1968 Winter Olympics and won the gold medal at the Canadian Figure Skating Championships in 1970.

Results

References

1949 births
Canadian male single skaters
Figure skaters at the 1968 Winter Olympics
Living people
Olympic figure skaters of Canada
Sportspeople from Sarnia